The Saxon Academy of Sciences and Humanities in Leipzig is an institute which was founded in 1846 under the name Royal Saxon Society for the Sciences.

Notable members
 Eberhard Ackerknecht
 Kurt Aland
 Annette Beck-Sickinger
 Walther Bothe
 Alexander Cartellieri
 James Chadwick
 Otto Clemen
 Bernard Comrie
 Peter Debye
 Johann Paul von Falkenstein
 Theodor Frings
 Horst Fuhrmann
 Bernhard Hänsel
 Werner Heisenberg
 Gustav Hertz
 Archibald Vivian Hill
 Cuno Hoffmeister
 Ernst Joest
Elisabeth Karg-Gasterstädt
 Jörg Kärger
 Hermann Kolbe
 Foteini Kolovou
 Walter König
 Hermann August Korff
 Hellmut Kretzschmar
 August Krogh
 Christoph Krummacher
 Ursula Lehr
 Volker Leppin
 Rolf Lieberwirth
 Heiner Lück
 Heinrich Magirius
 Karl Mannsfeld
 Theodor Mommsen
 August Ferdinand Möbius
 Karl Alexander Müller
 Wilhelm Ostwald
 Heinz Penzlin
 Max Planck
 Manfred Rudersdorf
 Gertrud Schubart-Fikentscher
 Ernst Schubert
 Manfred Schubert
 Cornelius Weiss
 Carl Friedrich von Weizsäcker
 Paula Hertwig (1889–1983), German biologist, politician
 Max Planck (1858–1947), German physicist
 Otto Vossler (1902−1987), historian

References

External links
 
 

Union of German Academies of Sciences and Humanities
1846 establishments in Germany
Scientific organizations established in 1846
1846 establishments in Saxony